"Revolution" (stylised in all caps) is a song by Japanese rock band Coldrain. It is the lead single for their sixth studio album The Side Effects, produced by Michael Baskette, written by Masato Hayakawa and Ryo Yokochi, and was released on 12 December 2018.

Stylistically, this approaches a more experimental sound by incorporating some rap elements, of which Coldrain has not used before. This is what would typically be associated with the sub-genre of nu metal.

Background
"Revolution" was released on 12 December 2018 as the band's lead single and the eleventh track off their sixth studio album The Side Effects, the follow-up and second single "Coexist" would be released in July 2019.

On 29 September, a new video game Mobile Suit Gundam: Extreme Vs. 2 was announced. Alongside the announcement, Coldrain would provide the theme song for the game. A new song titled "Revolution".
However after the release of the game, they kept quiet. This was until they unexpectedly released the single on 12 December, instantly becoming a fan favourite among Coldrain fans.

Composition
"Revolution" is a nu metal and a metalcore song. The track runs at 148 BPM and is in the key of D minor. It runs for three minutes and 45 seconds. The song was written by Masato Hayakawa and Ryo Yokochi, while Michael Baskette handled the production for the single as well as the entirety of the album.

Track listing

Live performances
 The official live version of "Revolution" was performed at Blare Fest 2020 and was the first of two performances that was used to promote the live album for Live & Backstage at Blare Fest. 2020, of which the performance was included on. The performance was released on the band's official YouTube channel on 4 September 2020.

Music video

The music video for "Revolution" was released over a whole month after the singles release, being released on 25 January 2019, and was directed by Koh Yamada.

The music video takes homage to "In the End" by Linkin Park. Visual and stylistic references are shown throughout as the band play the song in a desert, intertwined with a dark setting with a visible decaying tree in the background. In the climax, the sun would drop down on the band, draining life from their surroundings and making the performing band turn into dust as the song ends.

As of January 2023, the music video for "Revolution" has over 2.5 million views on YouTube.

Personnel
Credits adapted from Tidal.

Coldrain

 Masato Hayakawa – lead vocals, lyrics
 Ryo Yokochi – lead guitar, programming, composition
 Kazuya Sugiyama – rhythm guitar
 Ryo Shimizu – bass guitar
 Katsuma Minatani – drums

Additional personnel
 Michael Baskette – producer, mixing, arrangements
 Ted Jensen – mastering
 Jeff Moll – recording engineer
 Joshua Saldate – assistant engineer

Charts

References 

Songs about revolutions
Coldrain songs
2018 songs
2018 singles
Song recordings produced by Michael Baskette
Warner Music Japan singles
Songs written by Masato Hayakawa
Nu metal songs
Metalcore songs